A Feminist Dictionary is an alternative dictionary written by Cheris Kramarae and Paula A. Treichler, with assistance from Ann Russo, originally published by Pandora Press in 1985. A revised second edition of the text was published in 1992 under the title Amazons, Bluestockings, and Crones: A Feminist Dictionary. The dictionary contains over 2500 words and definitions from a feminist perspective and, in the words of one reviewer, forces the reader "to consider who assembles the dictionaries usually consulted and to ask how the words have been chosen." A Feminist Dictionary does not adhere to lexicographical convention: rather than offering readers objective descriptions for each entry, it uses the dictionary format to wryly comment upon and critique gender dynamics. One commentator described the resulting volume as a "sort of a cross between the OED and the Whole Earth Catalog."

The purpose of a Feminist Dictionary 
Through the use of academic papers, speeches, and even graffiti it is possible to create feminist dictionaries that arguably are needed for several reasons. One argument, made by feminist author Cheris Kramarae, is that society is not able to put women's experiences into words. Kramarae's point is that women's experiences are not accounted for as our language was never designed to reflect women. The author is arguing that by creating new words, and through redefining existing ones we will start to see a society that is more equal. One that reflects all experiences and where everyone can express exactly what they are feeling, as men and women communicate differently. In "Gender, Language, and Discourse: A Review Essay," author Deborah Cameron explains that men and women use language differently. However, it is according to Cameron not enough to simply acknowledge how men and women differ in their use of language. Instead, when raising concerns about language we should look at how language is interpreted or used.

In an analysis of several feminist dictionaries published between 1970 and 2006, the scholar Lindsay Rose Russell argues that the first and second editions of A Feminist Dictionary differ from each other in a way that reflects the shortcomings of feminist dictionary making on the whole: "The fate of A Feminist Dictionary, originally published in 1985 and reissued in 1992 as Amazons, Bluestockings and Crones, is, I think, telling of how the radical revolution proposed by feminist English language lexicography was (and is) tamed: as A Feminist Dictionary, the text threatens a theoretical frame (feminist) with which to supplant both the theoretical principles of lexicography and the kinds of dictionaries such principles have traditionally produced, but as Amazons, Bluestockings and Crones, the text becomes rather more like a harmless helpmate to the lexicographical tradition, a specialized dictionary of boutique terms (Amazon, bluestocking, crone) that dress up (or down) other more sober and conventional tomes. In this move from suffragist to supplement, feminist dictionaries have lost not only their revolutionary theoretical sophistication but also their potential to act as a useable past by which we can better understand the history of and imagine a future for the dictionary genre."

See also 

Muted group theory
Testosterone poisoning

References 

Feminist literature